First love unlimited is a 1997 Hong Kong romantic comedy film directed by Joe Ma Wai Ho and starring: two pop stars Daniel Chan Hiu Tung and Gigi Leung Wing Kei. Released at the end of spring in 1997, The film created a fan fever for Hong Kong youth back then. A sweet little movie with two perfectly cast Hong Kong heartthrobs, First Love Unlimited captures the wondrous excitement of first love with tremendous heart and winning humor.

Cast
 Daniel Chan Hiu-Tung as Shum Chi Hong
 Gigi Leung Wing-Kei as Tap/Stephainie Wong	 
 Joyce Chan Yin Hang as Angie (Tap's friend)
 Stephen Fung Tak Lun as Chris
 Ricky Hui Kun Ying as Uncle Chicken Wing (Hong's father)
 Vincent Kok Tak Chiu as Fatty 
 Matt Chow Hoi Kwong as Stephen
 Tina Lau Tin Laan as Mrs Tina Wong (Tap's mother)
 Wyman Wong Wai Man as Mimi (Hong's friend)
 Edward Yang as Tap's step-dad
 Lee Siu-Kei as Security at amusement park (Mimi's father)
 Erica Yuen Lai-Ming as Hong's sister
 Lam Ho-Yeung as Restaurant customer	 	 
 Soi Cheang Pou-Soi as Restaurant customer
 Joe Ma Wai-Ho	as Hong's audio equipment boss
 Andy Tsang Tak-Wah as La Salle student

Synopsis
Only the lack of roses in every frame prevent this teen romance from being a live action Shojo Manga. Raised in the housing project, The poor boy Shum Chi Hong (Daniel Chan) meets a daughter of a wealthy family, Ah Tap (Gigi Leung). They go to the movies for their first date, but in the end they buy wrong tickets. Although they couldn't see the movie, they hold hands for the first time. On the bus ride home, Tap sweetly sleeps on Hong's shoulder, an unforgettable experience for Hong. Hong walks Tap to her door and they kiss goodbye as they reluctantly part. At first, Hong tells a lie about his low-born because he fears that she never fall in love with him. But later, Tap's mother (Tina Lau) discovers the relationship and fearing it would affect Tap's education strongly opposes it, as she would go as far as sending her to study abroad.
 
Tap, a shy good girl who finds first love with the charming, boyish Hong. Physically and emotionally, the two are a perfect match, but their backgrounds couldn't be more different. Tap is an elite student destined for greater things, while Hong is a low-income brat sired by a lone parent (Ricky Hui). Though Tap believes that love can conquer all, her strict, yet loving mother isn't quite convinced. Can Tap and Hong - two young teens who seemingly share the same heart and soul - keep their perfect love in an imperfect world?.

Soundtrack
The soundtrack of the film sung by Daniel Chan and Gigi Leung including their hit songs such as: Guess guess guess, Zai hu ni gan shou, Short hair, Understand your everything, Shen Mo Xi Yin, Guitar, Dating with Danny, Psychedelic....Among them, the cover version "Dating with Danny" is the main theme song.

References

External links
 

1997 films
1997 romantic comedy films
Hong Kong romantic comedy films
1990s Cantonese-language films
1990s Hong Kong films